Bernard Lefebvre (27 March 1906 - 30 November 1992), known as Ellebé, was a French photographer. He was a member of the Rouen Academy, and president of the Rouen Photo-club from 1937-1941 and 1951-1977.

Works
 Charles Rabot, Croisière arctique, Rouen, 1932  Illustrations by Pierre Le Trividic and photographs by Bernard Lefebvre.
 Conseils aux amateurs qui désirent se documenter par la photographie, Rouen, 1939
 Les Cinématographes de la  de Rouen : 1896-1907, CRDP, Mont-Saint-Aignan, 1982
 Avec de Gaulle en Afrique, ed. Bertout, Luneray, 1990

Bibliography
 Le Grand Livre des Rouennais, ed. for P'tit Normand, Rouen, 1983
 Georges Lanfry, La Cathédrale retrouvée, ed. Point de vues, Bonsecours, 2006 

French photographers
1906 births
1992 deaths
Knights of the Ordre national du Mérite